Chou Sinti (born 01 April 2003) is a Cambodian footballer currently playing as a midfielder for Preah Khan Reach Svay Rieng  in the Cambodian Premier League, and the Cambodia national team.

Career
Sinti first call up to the national team was to play in a AFC Asian Cup qualifiers game away against India, which Cambodia lost 2–0. The next game Sinti took part in was against Afghanistan where Cambodia fought back to a 2–2 draw.

References

External links
 

2003 births
Living people
Cambodian footballers
Cambodia international footballers
People from Battambang province
Association football midfielders
Competitors at the 2021 Southeast Asian Games
Southeast Asian Games competitors for Cambodia
21st-century Cambodian people